Galinsoga parviflora is a herbaceous plant in the Asteraceae (daisy) family. It has several common names including guasca (Colombia), pacpa yuyo, paco yuyo, and waskha (Peru), burrionera (Ecuador), albahaca silvestre and saetilla (Argentina), mielcilla (Costa Rica), piojito (Oaxaca, Mexico), galinsoga (New Zealand), gallant soldier, quickweed, and potato weed (United Kingdom, United States).

History
Galinsoga parviflora was brought from Peru to Kew Gardens in 1796, and later escaped to the wild in Great Britain and Ireland, being temporarily known as the 'Kew Weed'. The plant is named after the Spanish botanist Ignacio Mariano Martinez de Galinsoga. The species name 'parviflora' translates to 'having small flowers'. In Britain, its name Galinsoga is sometimes popularly rendered as "gallant soldiers", and then sometimes altered to "soldiers of the Queen". In Malawi, where the plant is naturalised, it is known as 'Mwamuna aligone' which translates to 'My husband is sleeping'.

Description
It is a branched herb with opposite stalked leaves, toothed at the margins. The flowers are in small heads. The central disc florets are yellow and tubular.

Distribution
The species is native to South America; however, it is widely naturalized in other countries. There are a few records of G. parviflora and G. quadriradiata in Northern Ireland. It has been naturalized elsewhere, including North America and Australasia.

Uses
In Colombia it is used as an herb in the soup ajiaco. It can also be used as an ingredient in leaf salads, although its subtle flavour, reminiscent of artichoke, mostly develops after being cooked. In eastern Africa, the plant is collected from the wild, and its leaves, stem and flowers eaten. It is also dried and ground into powder for use in soups.

Phytochemicals 
In G. parviflora, the major phytochemicals are phenolic acids, depsides and flavonoids with their corresponding glycosides. The flavonoids present are patulitrin, quercimeritrin, quercetagetin, luteolin 7-β-D-glucopyranoside, apigenin 7-β-D-glucoside, galinsoside A, galinsoside B, 7,3’,4’-trihydroxyflavanone and 3,5,7,3’,4’-pentahydroxyflavanone. Phenolic acids and depsides includes vanillic acid, isovanillic acid, p-coumaric acid, p-hydroxybenzoic acid, o-hydroxyphenyl acetic acid, caffeic acid, chlorogenic acid and caffeoylglucaric acids.

References

External links

Photo of herbarium specimen at Missouri Botanical Garden, collected in Brazil in 1987
Photo of herbarium specimen at Missouri Botanical Garden, collected in Dominican Republic in 2006

parviflora
Flora of North America
Flora of South America
Plants described in 1796
Plants used in traditional African medicine
Herbs
Taxa named by Antonio José Cavanilles